Streets of Shanghai is a 1927 American silent drama film directed by Louis J. Gasnier and written by Harry Braxton and Jack Natteford. The film, starring Pauline Starke, Kenneth Harlan, and Eddie Gribbon, was released by Tiffany-Stahl Productions.

Cast
Pauline Starke as Mary Sanger
Kenneth Harlan as Sergeant Lee
Eddie Gribbon as Swede
Margaret Livingston as Sadie
Jason Robards, Sr. as Eugene Fong (as Jason Robards)
Mathilde Comont as Buttercup, Mary's Companion
Sōjin Kamiyama as Fong Kiang 
Anna May Wong as Su Quan
Tetsu Komai as Chang Ho
Toshia Mori as Girl Wife (as Toshyie Ichioka)
Media Ichioka as F'aien Shi, the Chinese Girl

Preservation status
This is now considered a lost film.

See also
List of American films of 1927

References

External links

Streets of Shanghai at SilentEra

American silent feature films
1927 drama films
Silent American drama films
1927 films
Lost American films
Tiffany Pictures films
Films directed by Louis J. Gasnier
American black-and-white films
1927 lost films
Lost drama films
1920s American films